Harvey Daniel "Ginger" Clark (March 7, 1879 – May 10, 1943) was a Major League Baseball pitcher for a very brief time during the  season. The right-hander was born in Wooster, Ohio.

This "one-game wonder" played for the Cleveland Bronchos on August 11, 1902. He earned a win by pitching the last six innings of a 17–11 victory over the Baltimore Orioles. Though he gave up four earned runs, Clark collected two hits in four at-bats (.500), scoring two runs, and fielding three chances without an error (1.000). This all took place in front of the home crowd at League Park.  After his stint with Cleveland, Clark played nine seasons in the minor leagues, seven of those with the Birmingham Barons, winning 133 games.

Clark died at the age of 64 in Lake Charles, Louisiana. He is buried in Wooster, Ohio.

References

External links

Retrosheet

1879 births
1943 deaths
Cleveland Bronchos players
Major League Baseball pitchers
Baseball players from Ohio
Birmingham Barons players
New Orleans Pelicans (baseball) players
Chattanooga Lookouts players
Mansfield Brownies players
People from Wooster, Ohio